Nesrin Hanım ("wild rose", 1826 - 2 January 1853) was a consort of Sultan Abdulmejid I of the Ottoman Empire.

She was Georgian, daughter of the noble Manuçar Bey Asemiani, and was chosen by Abdülmejid's mother, Bezmiâlem Sultan, as consort for her son. She married Abdulmejid in 1842. She was given the title of "Third Ikbal" and later "Second Ikbal". The same year, she gave birth to her first child, a son Şehzade Mehmed Ziyaeddin. The prince died young. On 6 August 1848, she gave birth to her second child, a daughter, Behice Sultan in the Old Çırağan Palace.

In 1850 she gave birth to twins, Şehzade Mehmed Nizameddin and Şehzade Mehmed Bahaeddin. Abdulmejid was on a trip in Anatolia, and received the news of their birth through his mother, Bezmiâlem Sultan. Both the princes died young.

She died on 2 January 1853, for the pain of the loss of three children and tuberculosis, and was buried in New Mosque, Istanbul. Her daughter Behice Sultan was adopted by one of Abdülmejid's other consort, Şayan Kadın.

Issue

In literature
Nesrin is a character in Hıfzı Topuz's historical novel Abdülmecit: İmparatorluk Çökerken Sarayda 22 Yıl: Roman (2009).

See also
Ikbal (title)
Ottoman Imperial Harem
List of consorts of the Ottoman sultans

References

Sources

1853 deaths
19th-century people from the Ottoman Empire
Ottoman Sunni Muslims
Consorts of Abdulmejid I